Pantayo is a Canadian quintet consisting of queer members of the Filipino diaspora formed in 2012. They combines elements of kulintang with elements of electronic, synth-pop, punk, and R&B music. Their name is Tagalog for "for us". The band consists of vocalist, bassist, and keyboardist Eirene Cloma; vocalist and agung player Michelle Cruz; vocalist, gandingan player, and sarunay player Joanna Delos Reyes; vocalist, kulintang and dabakan player Kat Estacio; and vocalist, kulintang player, and sarunay player Katrina Estacio. They were named as one of NOW Magazine's Toronto Indie Musicians to Watch in 2018.

History 
They formed in 2012 and collaborated with Yamantaka // Sonic Titan on the soundtrack to the 2016 video game Severed. Their debut album, Pantayo, was released in 2020 and was produced by Alaska B from Yamantaka // Sonic Titan. It was shortlisted for the 2020 Polaris Music Prize.

Discography 
Pantayo (2020)

References 

Musical quintets
Canadian world music groups
Musical groups established in 2012
2012 establishments in Ontario